Roaring Ridge is a long and outstanding spur that descends from the Watson Escarpment 3.5 nautical miles (6 km) northeast of Mount Blackburn. Mapped by United States Geological Survey (USGS) from surveys and U.S. Navy air photos, 1960–64. So named by New Zealand Geological Survey Antarctic Expedition (NZGSAE) (1969–70) because two geologists worked and camped nearby, experiencing roaring gale-force winds rushing down the steep escarpment.

References 
 

Ridges of Marie Byrd Land